Robert Radcliffe may refer to:

Robert Radcliffe of Hunstanton (died 1497), English landowner
Robert Radcliffe, 1st Earl of Sussex (c. 1483–1542), courtier and soldier
Robert Radclyffe, 5th Earl of Sussex (1573–1629), English peer
Robert Radcliffe (cricketer) (1797–1832), English cricketer

See also
Bobby Radcliff
Bob Radcliffe, namesake of the Bob Radcliffe Cup